These are the official results of the Women's Triple Jump event at the 1993 IAAF World Championships in Stuttgart, Germany. There were a total of 30 participating athletes, with two qualifying groups and the final held on Saturday August 21, 1993. For the first this event was staged at the World Championships.

Medalists

Schedule
All times are Central European Time (UTC+1)

Abbreviations
All results shown are in metres

Qualifying round
Held on Friday 1993-08-20

Final

See also
 1992 Men's Olympic Triple Jump
 1995 Women's World Championships Triple Jump

References
 Results

T
Triple jump at the World Athletics Championships
1993 in women's athletics